Euphorbia ammak is a species of plant in the family Euphorbiaceae. It is found in Saudi Arabia and Yemen.

As most other succulent members of the genus Euphorbia, its trade is regulated under Appendix II of CITES.

References

ammak
ammak
Vulnerable plants
Taxonomy articles created by Polbot